Penn Treaty School is a grade 6-12 school in the Fishtown area of Philadelphia, Pennsylvania. A part of the School District of Philadelphia, it was formerly Penn Treaty Junior High School and Penn Treaty Middle School.

Architecture
The school is based in a historic building designed by Irwin T. Catharine and built in 1927–1928.  It is a five-story, 17-bay, brick building in the Late Gothic Revival style.  It features a projecting end pavilions with arched openings, carved limestone decorative elements, a large stone Gothic entryway, and a large battlement tower.  It was named to commemorate Penn's Treaty with the Indians.

History
It was added to the National Register of Historic Places in 1988. It previously fed into Kensington High School.

 it had about 700 students. In the 2017–2018 school year, the school was 40% Hispanic, 30% African American, 20% Caucasian, and 10% Other.

References

External links
 Penn Treaty School

School buildings on the National Register of Historic Places in Philadelphia
Gothic Revival architecture in Pennsylvania
School buildings completed in 1928
Public high schools in Pennsylvania
Bridesburg-Kensington-Richmond, Philadelphia
Public middle schools in Pennsylvania
School District of Philadelphia
1928 establishments in Pennsylvania